The 1898 Maine gubernatorial election took place on September 12, 1898.

Incumbent Republican Governor Llewellyn Powers was re-elected to a second term in office, defeating Democratic candidate Samuel L. Lord.

Results

Notes

References

Gubernatorial
1898
Maine
September 1898 events